"Tonight" is a song by English hard rock band Def Leppard from their 1992 album, Adrenalize. It was originally recorded during a break in the Hysteria World Tour as a possible B-side to one of the singles from their fourth album, Hysteria. but was shelved and re-recorded during the Adrenalize sessions. "Tonight" is the sixth international single from Adrenalize and the fifth single in both the US and UK. In the US, the song reached number 13 on the Billboard Album Rock Tracks charts and number 62 on the Billboard Hot 100. It also peaked at number 34 on the UK Singles Chart.

Music video
The music video was directed by Wayne Isham.

Track listings
CD: Bludgeon Riffola / 862 231-2 (Germany)
 "Tonight"
 "Now I'm Here" (live) (recorded at Wembley Stadium, London, 20 April 1992)
 "Photograph" (live) (recorded at the Biskuithalle in Bonn, Germany, 29 May 1992)
 "Tonight" (demo) (recorded 5 May 1988)

CD: Mercury / 862 017-2 (US)
 "Tonight"
 "She's Too Tough"
 "Pour Some Sugar on Me" (live)

Cassette single: Mercury / 862 016-4 (US)
 "Tonight"
 "She's Too Tough"

7-inch: Mercury / 862 016-7 (US)
 "Tonight"
 "She's Too Tough"

7-inch: Bludgeon Riffola - Mercury / LEP 10 (UK)
 "Tonight"
 "Now I'm Here" (live)

12-inch: Bludgeon Riffola - Mercury / LEPX 11 (UK) / 862 287-1 (international) / picture disc

This picture disc has on the cover same graphic as the Adrenalize album, but in a small size. On the back of the disc, there is the picture of Rick Allen. On the cardboard that comes with the disc, there is a band picture and the track listing. Pictures by Ross Halfin.
 "Tonight"
 "Now I'm Here" (live)
 "Hysteria" (live)

CD: Bludgeon Riffola - Mercury / LEPCD 10 (UK)
 "Tonight"
 "Now I'm Here" (live)
 "Photograph" (live)

CD: Bludgeon Riffola - Mercury / LEPCB 10 (UK)
 "Tonight"
 "Pour Some Sugar on Me" (live)
 "Tonight" (demo)

Charts

Release history

References

Def Leppard songs
1992 songs
1993 singles
Mercury Records singles
Music videos directed by Wayne Isham
Songs written by Joe Elliott
Songs written by Phil Collen
Songs written by Rick Savage
Songs written by Robert John "Mutt" Lange
Songs written by Steve Clark